Semra is a small village in Buxar district of Bihar state, India.  The village is surrounded by river Ganga from three sides.  Bhojpuri is the native language of Semra.  Arahar dal and usina chawal are major products of the region.

References

Villages in Buxar district